800 Saint-Jacques Street West is an office building under construction in Montreal, Quebec, Canada. The building is situated facing Boul Robert Bourassa in the Quartier de l’innovation of Downtown Montreal, and is linked to Montreal's Underground City.

When completed in 2022, the National Bank of Canada will be the sole occupant of the building. The building will be tied with neighbouring Victoria sur le Parc to become the third tallest buildings in Montreal.

History
In January 2018, construction and real estate development firm Broccolini purchased the plot of land for C$100 million. Before being purchased the site was occupied by a public parking lot.

600 De La Gauchetière was be put up for sale by the National Bank of Canada shortly after groundbreaking in November 2018, with the proceeds going toward the construction of their new headquarters.

Design
The building will feature a glass and steel facade that points upward toward the south. It will also feature an outdoor garden on the 40th floor and be surrounded a large public park in order to introduce more greenspace into Downtown Montreal and attract foot traffic outside of the National Bank of Canada's business hours.

See also
List of tallest buildings in Montreal
List of tallest buildings in Quebec

References

Bank headquarters in Canada
Downtown Montreal
Skyscraper office buildings in Canada
Skyscrapers in Montreal
Modernist architecture in Canada
National Bank of Canada